O8 or O-8 may refer to:

 Douglas O-8, an airplane
 Oasis Hong Kong Airlines, a defunct Hong Kong airline
 Octaoxygen (O8) an allotrope of oxygen 
 Omaha/8, a poker variant
 Siam Air, a defunct Thai airline
 , a O-class submarine of the United States Navy
 O-8, a pay grade of the uniformed services of the United States

See also
08 (disambiguation)